Granular layer may refer to:
 Granular layer (cerebellum) of the cortex of the human cerebellum
 Granular layer (cerebral cortex) of the cerebral cortex
 Granular layer of skin
 Granular layer of dentate gyrus